Carnosauria is an extinct large group of predatory dinosaurs that lived during the Jurassic and Cretaceous periods. Starting from the 1990s, scientists have discovered some very large carnosaurs in the carcharodontosaurid family, such as Giganotosaurus, Mapusaurus, Carcharodontosaurus and Tyrannotitan which are among the largest known predatory dinosaurs.

While it originally contained a wide assortment of giant theropods that were not closely related, the group has since been defined to encompass only the allosaurs and their closest kin. However, with the description and publication in 2019 of Asfaltovenator vialidadi, a basal allosauroid displaying both primitive and derived features seen in Tetanurae, the new phylogenetic analysis has found Megalosauroidea to be a basal grade of carnosaurs in respect to Allosauroidea; thus significantly expanding Carnosauria's inclusiveness towards its original context.

Distinctive characteristics of carnosaurs include large eyes, a long narrow skull and modifications of the legs and pelvis such as the thigh (femur) being longer than the shin (tibia).

Carnosaurs first appeared in the Middle Jurassic, around 176 mya. The last definite known carnosaurs, the carcharodontosaurs, became extinct in the Turonian epoch of the Cretaceous, roughly 90 mya; reportedly later remains of carcharodontosaurids, from the late Maastrichtian (70–66 Ma ago) Bauru Group in Brazil, were later interpreted as those of abelisaurids. The phylogenetically problematic megaraptorans, which may or may not be carnosaurs, became extinct around 66 mya.
Unquillosaurus is another possible Carnosaurian Theropod that has an extended range, hailing from rocks dated to the Campanian, around 75-70 mya.

Systematics
Modern cladistic analysis defines Carnosauria as those tetanurans sharing a more recent common ancestor with Allosaurus than with modern birds.

Taxonomy
Carnosauria has traditionally been used as a dumping ground for all large theropods. Even non-dinosaurs, such as the rauisuchian Teratosaurus, were once considered carnosaurs. However, analysis in the 1980s and 1990s revealed that other than size, the group shared very few characteristics, making it polyphyletic. Most former carnosaurs (such as the megalosaurids, the spinosaurids, and the ceratosaurs) were reclassified as more primitive theropods. Others (such as  the tyrannosaurids) that were more closely related to birds were placed in Coelurosauria.

Phylogeny
The clade Allosauroidea was originally proposed by Phil Currie and Zhao (1993; p. 2079), and later used as an undefined stem-based taxon by Paul Sereno (1997). Sereno (1998; p. 64) was the first to provide a stem-based definition for the Allosauroidea, defining the clade as "All neotetanurans closer to Allosaurus than to Neornithes." Kevin Padian (2007) used a node-based definition, defined the Allosauroidea as Allosaurus, Sinraptor, their most recent common ancestor, and all of its descendants. Thomas R. Holtz and colleagues (2004; p. 100) and  Phil Currie and Ken Carpenter (2000), among others, have followed this node-based definition. However, in some analyses (such as Currie & Carpenter, 2000), the placement of the carcharodontosaurids relative to the allosaurids and sinraptorids is uncertain, and therefore it is uncertain whether or not they are allosauroids (Currie & Carpenter, 2000).

The cladogram presented here follows the 2010 analysis by Benson, Carrano and Brusatte.

In 2019, Rauhut and Pol described Asfaltovenator vialidadi, a basal allosauroid displaying a mosaic of primitive and derived features seen within Tetanurae. Their phylogenetic analysis found traditional Megalosauroidea to represent a basal grade of carnosaurs, paraphyletic with respect to Allosauroidea.

"Carnosaurus"

"Carnosaurus" is an informal generic name, attributed to Friedrich von Huene, ca. 1929. It is the result of a typographical error created by the translation of the von Huene monograph from German to Spanish. Von Huene himself intended to assign indeterminate remains to Carnosauria incertae sedis.

See also 
 portal:dinosaur
 Carnotaurus

References

Sources
  (on "Carnosaurus")
 
 Holtz, T. R., Jr. and Osmólska H. 2004. Saurischia; pp. 21–24 in D. B. Weishampel, P. Dodson, and H. Osmólska (eds.), The Dinosauria (2nd ed.), University of California Press, Berkeley.

External links

 
Aalenian first appearances
Turonian extinctions
Fossil taxa described in 1920
Taxa named by Friedrich von Huene